The Seal of Phnom Penh is the municipality seal used by the City Hall of Phnom Penh.

Symbolism and description

Description 
The seal is round with a light black outer ring, which is a bit light some might not see it. In the ring consists of a violet-purple-like color inner ring with a palm tree and other trees with the same color. Others include Wat Phnom and Spean Neak also in the same color.

Symbolism 

The palm tree (Daeum Tnaôt) represents Cambodia, the other trees represent nature, Wat Phnom (lit. "Mountain Pagoda") and Spean Neak (lit. "Dragon Bridge") represent Phnom Penh.

Phnom Penh
Phnom Penh